WiPay is a Caribbean-based payment facilitation company that provides the infrastructure necessary for sub-merchants to begin accepting credit card payments. The company aggregates payments by onboarding sub-merchants through the provision of financial technologies needed to process electronic payments and receive funds. In September 2019, MasterCard announced its partnership with WiPay to advance electronic payments across the Caribbean. As a MasterCard Principal Partner, Wipay is also the Caribbean's only licensed Payment Facilitator (PAYFAC) on both MasterCard and Visa Networks. WiPay offers Credit Card Processing, Website Plugins through application programming interfaces (APIs), Peer-to-Peer Transfers, Remittances, Bill Payments, and Government Services.

WiPay was founded in 2017 by Trinidadian businessman Aldwyn Wayne, who created an online payment solution for Caribbean users. Aldwyn is a graduate of Georgia Tech Institute. In January 2022, Aldwyn launched Colour Bank, a US-Based Neobank for the Caribbean and African Diasporas in America. Colour Bank allows Caribbean students in universities across the United States to open bank accounts without a social security number.  WiPay, Aldwyn Wayne, and Ted Lucas, CEO of Slip-n-Slide Records, are the majority shareholders of Colour Bank which has a market value of US$75 Million.

Partnerships 

In October 2019 Republic Bank acquired a 19.99% stake in Nobis Baas Ltd, a subsidiary of WiPay Holdings Limited, for US$10 Million.  Republic Bank Holding Limited is the largest bank in the Caribbean.

In February 2020, WiPay acquired a partnership stake in South Florida-based,  Caribshopper. CaribShopper is an e-commerce solution that gives Caribbean manufacturers a platform to sell and ship locally made products to North America.

See also 
 Electronic commerce
 List of online payment service providers
 Payment gateway
 Payment service provider

References 

Business software
Financial services companies established in 2016
Financial technology
Online payments
Payment service providers
Web applications
Internet properties established in 2016